The 2002 Copa Sudamericana Finals was a two-legged football match played to determine the champion of the 2002 Copa Sudamericana, the inaugural edition of this tournament. The tie was contested between Argentine side San Lorenzo de Almagro and Colombian side Atlético Nacional. 

San Lorenzo won 4–0 on aggregate, achieving the first international title in their history.

Qualified teams

Venues

Route to the final

Match details

First leg

note: Match was suspended at the 70th minute because a flare from the Atletico Nacional fans struck Aldo Paredes. A few minutes later, the match was resumed, but it was suspended at the 89th minute after Aquivaldo Mosquera was shown a red card. and Nacional fans started to throw objects onto the field.

Second leg

References

2
Copa Sudamericana Finals
S
S
Football in Buenos Aires
Copa Sudamericana Finals
Copa Sudamericana Finals